Yunkyur is the name of several rural localities in the Sakha Republic, Russia:
Yunkyur, Olyokminsky District, Sakha Republic, a selo in Malzhagarsky Rural Okrug of Olyokminsky District
Yunkyur, Verkhoyansky District, Sakha Republic, a selo in Sartansky Rural Okrug of Verkhoyansky District